Tall Bazi, is an ancient Near East archaeological site in Raqqa Governorate of Syria in the same general area as Mari and Ebla. It is located on the Euphrates river in upper Syria, about 60 kilometers south of Turkey near the abandoned town of Tall Banat. Tall Bazi has been proposed as the location of Armanum, known from texts of the Akkadian period, during the reign of Naram-Sin of Akkad. It was occupied into the Mitanni period at which time it was destroyed. In the late Roman Empire a large building was constructed at the top of the main mound.

Archaeology
The main mound rises 60 meters above the plain with the lower town portion being only 7 meters high. It was excavated by German archaeologists in 1993–1997, in 1999, in 2001–2005, and then in 2007–2009. At this point local conditions became too difficult to continue work. The excavations were under the auspices of the German Research Foundation and later the Institute of Near Eastern Archaeology.

Due to the Tishrin Dam construction the lower town is now under water. The main mound is still above water. The adjacent third millennium BC archaeological complex at Tall Banat was also flooded.

It is part of the "Tell Banat Settlement complex" during the third and second millennia BCE, which refers to Tell Banat, Tell Banat North, Tell Kabir and Jebel, or Tall Bazi.

History

Early Bronze 
An Early Bronze palace was found beneath the Middle Bronze temple. The earlier occupation of the Citadel dates back to the Late Early Dynastic period and Akkadian period. Numerous clay sling shots were found especially around a fortified wall gate.

The region was part of Banat Period IV (c. 2700/2600-2450 BC) during which time there is no clear evidence for Tall Bazi. In Banat Period III (c. 2450-2300 BC), Banat itself reached its maximum extent. At this time, building activity was found throughout the Banat complex, including Tell Kabir and Tall Bazi. Banat Period II (c. 2300-2100 BC) was a phase of abandonment of which occupation seem to continue on Tall Bazi. In Banat Period I (c. 2100-2000 BC), a new settlement appeared at Tell Kabir.

Middle Bronze 
The Northern Town was occupied beginning in the Middle Bronze Age and was destroyed at the same time as the Western Town. A geomagnetic prospection followed by excavation at four locations showed that the original portion was a grown settlement with later construction matching the planned houses of the Western Town.

The main mound has been dubbed the "Citadel". It contained a large (37.6 meter long by 15.8 meter wide) temple built in the Middle Bronze Age (on top of an Early Bronze Age palace) still in use when it was destroyed at the same time as the lower town in the Late Bronze Age.

Late Bronze 
In the remains of the temple were found evidence of significant production and ritual consumption of beer as well as two cuneiform tablets of the Mitanni period sealed by ruler Saushtatar, one by Artatama I, and an Old Babylonian cylinder seal. When the settlement was destroyed the temple was looted and equipment smashed, then burned like the lower town. More post destruction looting then occurred. 

The lower area is divided into a Western Town and Northern Town. The Western Town  (1 hectare) is a single period area of the Late Bronze Age which lasted up to a century before it was violently destroyed. It contain about 100 houses with a central market area and planned 6 meter wide main roads with spurs into residential areas. Houses were built to a standard design with little variation. Destruction appears to have come quickly as most material was still in place. Each house had its own oven for baking and vats for the production of beer. No human remains were found. Due to the sketchy nature of radiocarbon dating for this period dates radiocarbon samples have reported dates ranging from 1400 BC down to 1200 BC for the destruction layer. A Mitanni period cylinder seal was found.

Modern times 
As a result of the Syrian Civil War the top of the mound was turned into a military emplacement with much of the remains, including the temple, being destroyed by bulldozer activity. Archaeological finds still being held at the site were robbed away by ISIS.

See also
Cities of the ancient Near East

References

Further reading
 T. L. McClellan, "Banat." In: H. Weiss (ed.), Archaeology in Syria, AJA, vol. 95, pp. 700–70, 1991
 B. Einwag and A. Otto, Tall Bazi, in: H. Weiss, Archaeology in Syria, AJA, vol.  101, pp. 108–111, 1997
 Otto, Adelheid and Berthold Einwag. “Three ritual vessels from the Mittani-period temple at Tell Bazi.” Stories told around the fountain. Papers offered to Piotr Bieliński on the occasion of his 70th birthday (2019): pp. 503-518
 Adelheid Otto, "Ritual Drinking in Syria: New Insights from the Decorated Terracotta Basin from Tall Bazi and the Funerary Talisman from Ebla: Pearls of the Past. Studies on Near Eastern Art and Archaeology in Honour of Frances Pinnock, hrsg. v. D'Andrea, Marta (marru 8).". IJBF Online: Internationale Jahresbibliographie der Festschriften. Berlin, Boston: K. G. Saur, 2009
 M. Zarnkow and A. Otto and B. Einwag, "Interdisciplinary Investigations into the Brewing Technology of the Ancient Near East and the Potential of the Cold Mashing Process", in: W. Schiefenhövel and H. Macbeth (Hrsg.), Liquid bread: beer and brewing in cross-cultural perspective, New York – Oxford, pp. 47–54, 2011
 B. Einwag, "Fortified Citadels in the Early Bronze Age? New Evidence from Tall Bazi (Syria)", in: J. Cordoba (Hrsg.), Proceedings of the Fifth International Congress on the Archaeology of the Ancient Near East, Madrid 2006, Madrid, pp. 741–53, 2008
 Szeląg, D. (2012). Tell Bazi in der Mittleren Bronzezeit: Die Untersuchungen am Nordhang. MDOG, 144, 133–160

External links
Tall Bazi excavation site at the Institute for Near Eastern Archaeology

Archaeological sites in Syria